Teliris was a privately owned telepresence and videoconferencing company, headquartered in New York City and London that designed and sold video collaboration products and services.

Company Overview
Teliris was founded in 1999 following a joint venture between Mycroft, a New York-based technology company, and the UK company Global Intercasting Ltd, which provided live satellite television programs for global corporate clients.

References

External links
 Teliris Website 

Software companies based in New York (state)
Software companies based in London
Defunct software companies of the United States